The Baptist Hymnal is the primary book of hymns and songs used for Christian worship in churches affiliated with the United States denomination, the Southern Baptist Convention.

The title was first used for a Convention publication in 1956, and a second version was released in 1975. The third version of The Baptist Hymnal was released in 1991.  The newest version of the Baptist Hymnal was released in 2008. All were printed by LifeWay Christian Resources, formerly known as the Sunday School Board of the Southern Baptist Convention; however, the 1956 printing names Convention Press as the printer and secured holder of copyright.

There is also a precursor to the 1956 publication entitled "The Baptist Hymn and Praise Book", published in 1904 in Nashville Tennessee. Though it was titled differently, it is considered the predecessor to the Southern Baptist Convention's "Baptist Hymnal" series.

The Worship Project
The new resource, The Worship Project, had the goal of "meeting the worship needs of churches by embarking on an innovative venture to couple an updated Baptist Hymnal with modern technology."

At a summit meeting in January 2007, leadership from across Southern Baptist life came together to contribute directly to the overall makeup of the project.  Attendees included music professors from Southern Baptist seminaries and 21 Baptist colleges, as well as church musicians, worship leaders, music industry leaders, representatives from the staff that created the 1991 Baptist Hymnal and current LifeWay employees who are devoted to the project.  Among other priorities discussed, the summit served as a means to get feedback from music practitioners on criteria for selecting the hymns, worship songs and praise choruses to be included.

In July 2007, LifeWay announced the names of the products to be included in the Worship Project: Baptist Hymnal, The Worship Hymnal, and lifewayworship.com.

In October 2007, a Theology Committee was convened at Southwestern Baptist Theological Seminary for a theological review of songs that will be included in the project.  Jon Duncan, state music director of the Georgia Baptist Convention, served as a committee leader.

The project was released in 2008.

Other works
The American Baptist Publication Society, Philadelphia published a book in 1883 called "The Baptist Hymnal". This work was published separately from the Sunday School Board of the Southern Baptist Convention and is not affiliated with the information of this page.

Aylesbury Press in Surrey Hills, Sydney, Australia published a book in 1967 called "The Hymnal" but also known as "The Baptist Hymnal". This is a work unrelated to the subject of this page.

See also
List of English-language hymnals by denomination

References

External links
lifewayworship.com
Baptist Hymnal 1991 at Hymnary.org
Baptist Hymnal 2008 at Hymnary.org

Protestant hymnals
Southern Baptist Convention
1956 books
1956 in Christianity
1975 books
1975 in Christianity
1991 books
1991 in Christianity
2008 non-fiction books
2008 in Christianity